Bartolommeo Gavanto  (Monza, Duchy of Milan 1569--Milan, 14 August 1638) was an Italian Barnabite priest and liturgist.

Life
Gavanto devoted himself early to liturgical studies. At Rome he was recognized as having a most accurate knowledge of the sacred rites. Gavanto was elected the Superior General of his Order, and, in recognition of his services, was named perpetual consultor to the Sacred Congregation of Rites by Pope Urban VIII.

Works

Gavanto's chief work is entitled Thesaurus sacrorum rituum seu commentaria in rubricas Missalis et Breviarii Romani (Milan, 1628; revised ed. by Merati, Rome, 1736–38). In this work the author traces the historical origin of the sacred rites themselves, treats of their mystical significance, gives rules as to the observance and obligation of the rubrics, and adds decrees and brief explanations bearing on the subject-matter of the work. The book was examined and approved by Cardinals Millino, Muto, and Cajetan, and was dedicated to his patron, Pope Urban.

References
 

1569 births
1638 deaths
People from Monza
Members of the Barnabite Order
16th-century Italian Roman Catholic priests
17th-century Italian Roman Catholic priests
Liturgists
Members of the Sacred Congregation for Rites